Two Outlaws is a 1928 American silent Western film directed by Henry MacRae and starring Jack Perrin and Kathleen Collins.

Cast
 Jack Perrin as Phil Manners / The Lone Rider 
 Rex the Wonder Horse as Rex, a Horse 
 Starlight the Horse as Starlight, a Horse 
 Kathleen Collins as Mary Ransome 
 J.P. McGowan as Abner Whitcomb 
 Cuyler Supplee as Other Man

References

Bibliography
 Langman, Larry. A Guide to Silent Westerns. Greenwood Publishing Group, 1992.

External links
 

1928 films
1928 Western (genre) films
American black-and-white films
Films directed by Henry MacRae
Universal Pictures films
Silent American Western (genre) films
1920s English-language films
1920s American films